Mafikeng Game Reserve is a game reserve in South Africa. Located in the city of Mafikeng, the reserve includes 46 square kilometres of Kalahari and Acacia bushveld, serving as the home of rhinoceroses, giraffes, gemsboks, buffaloes, wildebeests and springboks.

References

External links
https://archive.today/20140521032404/http://www.parksnorthwest.co.za/mafikeng_reserve/

North West Provincial Parks